"Street Symphony" is a song by American R&B singer Monica. It was written and produced by Dallas Austin for her second studio album, The Boy Is Mine (1998), featuring an orchestral background performed by the Atlanta Symphony Orchestra. The song was released as the album's fourth single in the United States ("Inside" was released in Europe only) in May 1999. It peaked at number 50 on the US Billboard Hot R&B/Hip-Hop Singles & Tracks chart.  "Street Symphony"s accompanying video was directed by Darren Grant.

Music video
A music video for "Street Symphony" was directed by Darren Grant. It takes place at night in downtown Atlanta, Georgia. In the video, Monica is seen wearing several dark outfits whilst singing and dancing through different sections of the song. Included are cuts of Monica and her female back-up dancers performing choreography in black leather costumes, with choreographed string players (violins and violas) in similarly dark clothing. The video is mainly composed of dark greys and blues despite black being a recurring color, presumably to go with the song’s emotional, somewhat bitter (yet mildly hopeful) subject matter.

The plot follows Monica's romance, and her decision to leave a lover involved in unspecified criminal activity. In the opening scenes, there are flashing police lights as police arrest a purposely edited/obscured man. Then, in a scene meant to have taken place hours earlier inside of a luxury apartment, we see Monica modeling and admiring various diamonds and jewels (presumably stolen property, given as gifts by her lover). During this scene, she sings about loving him much more than any ill-gotten luxury. Next we see Monica as the passenger in a car with her love driving, when he decides to make a quick “stop”. Whether or not this is meant to portray the dealing of illicit substances, pimping, gambling, fraud, or theft, it is never specified. All we see is the exchange of money. The two men walk off towards a dark place, which is revealed to be a parking garage, leaving Monica visibly distraught and alone in the car. She begins to realize there is no changing her love’s criminal ways. Back at the apartment, Monica tosses the same diamond jewels (that she previously admired) across the room. Then she departs, alone, with a defiant and determined swagger. Once outside, she spots the police car lights driving in the direction of her now ex-lover. He is arrested; Monica continues on her path.

Track listings

Credits and personnel 
Credits adapted from the liner notes of The Boy Is Mine.

 Atlanta Symphony Orchestra – orchestral performance
 Dallas Austin – producer, arranger, composer
 A. Baars – engineer
 Leslie Brathwaite – engineer, mixing
 Greg Crawford – engineer
 Eddie Horst – orchestral arrangements
 Ty Hudson – assistant engineer
 Debra Killings – background vocals
 Rico Lumpkin - engineer

 Andrew Lyn – assistant engineer
 Carlton Lynn - engineer, assistant engineer
 Monica – vocals
 Vernon Mungo – assistant engineer
 Claudine Pontier – assistant engineer
 Rick Sheppard – midi and sound design
 Kimberly Smith – production coordinator
 Gary White – composer

Charts

Release history

References

Songs about streets
1998 songs
1999 singles
Monica (singer) songs
Music videos directed by Darren Grant
Song recordings produced by Dallas Austin
Songs written by Dallas Austin
Arista Records singles